The 2016 KNSB Dutch Allround Championships in speed skating were held in Heerenveen at the Thialf ice skating rink from 22 January to 24 January 2016. The tournament was part of the 2015–2016 speed skating season. Jan Blokhuijsen and Antoinette de Jong won the allround titles.

Schedule

Medalists

Allround

Distance

Classification

Men's allround

Women's allround

Source:

References

2016 in speed skating
2016 in Dutch sport
2016 Allround
Sports competitions in Amsterdam
January 2016 sports events in Europe
2016 KNSB Dutch Allround Championships